P.M. Dawn was an American hip hop and R&B act that formed in 1988 by the brothers Attrell Cordes (known by his stage name Prince Be, sometimes credited as Prince Be the Nocturnal) and Jarrett Cordes (known as DJ Minutemix) in Jersey City, New Jersey. They earned significant crossover success in the early 1990s with music that merged hip hop, older soul, and more pop-oriented urban R&B.

After recording their debut single "Ode to a Forgetful Mind" in 1988, P.M. Dawn released their first album Of the Heart, of the Soul and of the Cross: The Utopian Experience in 1991 to critical acclaim. It achieved immediate commercial success because of its single "Set Adrift on Memory Bliss". Their 1993 follow-up The Bliss Album...? (Vibrations of Love and Anger and the Ponderance of Life and Existence) was also praised by critics and featured the hit singles "I'd Die Without You" and "Looking Through Patient Eyes". P.M. Dawn continued to receive strong reviews with their subsequent albums Jesus Wept (1995) and Dearest Christian, I'm So Very Sorry for Bringing You Here. Love, Dad (1998), which sold poorly.

Early history
Attrell Cordes began DJing parties and composing songs in ninth grade. Cordes, known by his stage name Prince Be, and his younger brother, Jarrett Cordes, known as DJ Minutemix, formed P.M. Dawn in 1988. The group's first demo tape was created using $600 that Prince Be had earned through his job as a night security guard at a homeless shelter.

They first approached Tommy Boy Records, the rap music subsidiary of Warner Brothers, with their demo, but they were told that they were too much like alternative hip-hoppers De La Soul, and not hardcore or ghetto, and were turned away. Eventually, Warlock, an independent record label, issued a debut single, "Ode to a Forgetful Mind", in 1989, but it went unnoticed.

The record label that released the single in the United Kingdom, Gee Street Records, found greater success. Gee Street mixed and marketed the song so that it earned considerable attention from music reviewers, and P.M. Dawn found themselves courted not just by Gee Street's head, Jon Baker, but also by most of the major UK record labels. Gee Street brought the brothers to London in 1990 to record tracks for an album; however, the label found itself facing bankruptcy during the recording. The entire Gee Street operation, along with P.M. Dawn's recording contract, was sold to the highest bidder, Island Records. Island issued a few more singles in the United Kingdom before releasing their debut album, Of the Heart, of the Soul and of the Cross: The Utopian Experience.

Career

"Set Adrift on Memory Bliss"
Of the Heart, of the Soul and of the Cross featured the international hit "Set Adrift on Memory Bliss", which sampled the Spandau Ballet song "True", and featured a cameo by Spandau Ballet singer Tony Hadley in the music video of the song. "Set Adrift on Memory Bliss" hit No. 1 the week of November 30, 1991, and is the first No. 1 song on the Billboard Hot 100 chart following the introduction of Nielsen SoundScan to the chart. The song also reached No. 3 in the United Kingdom. "Paper Doll", which was one of the early singles Island released in the United Kingdom, was released in the US as a follow-up to "Set Adrift on Memory Bliss", and peaked at No. 28 in early 1992.

With the success of their debut album, the band parted company with their manager Nick Hemmings and embarked on a world tour. During this world tour, Prince Be gave an interview to Details magazine in which he expressed skepticism of rapper KRS-One's activism: "KRS-One wants to be a teacher, but a teacher of what?" KRS-One and his crew, Boogie Down Productions, responded by storming a P.M. Dawn concert, forcing the group off the stage and performing their songs "I'm Still #1" and "The Bridge Is Over". Defending his actions to USA Todays James T. Jones IV, KRS-One remarked, "I answered his question. 'A teacher of what?' I'm a teacher of respect."

In 1992, P.M. Dawn appeared on the Red Hot Organization's compilation CD Red Hot + Dance, contributing the Richie Rich Mix of "Set Adrift on Memory Bliss". The album, featuring George Michael and Madonna among others, was meant to raise money and awareness in support of the AIDS epidemic. During February 12 of that same year, P.M. Dawn was nominated for the Brit Award and won International Breakthrough Act.

The Bliss Album...?
Before releasing their follow-up album, The Bliss Album...? (Vibrations of Love and Anger and the Ponderance of Life and Existence), P.M. Dawn contributed the single "I'd Die Without You" to the 1992 Eddie Murphy comedy Boomerang and its soundtrack. This #3 pop hit was also included on The Bliss Album...?, as was the Billboard #6 pop hit "Looking Through Patient Eyes".

"Looking Through Patient Eyes" featured backing vocals by Cathy Dennis and sampled George Michael's hit "Father Figure". The music video for the song was shot in a church, and featured Christian images throughout — most notably, Prince Be wore a T-shirt with "Thank you, Jesus" written across it in black lettering.

The Bliss Album...? featured a duet with Boy George entitled "More Than Likely" and a cover of The Beatles' "Norwegian Wood (This Bird Has Flown)".

The album also included "So On and So On," which led to a 1999 sampling lawsuit. In the lawsuit Batiste v. Island Records, Inc., Paul and Michael Batiste claimed that P.M. Dawn's song "So On and So On" used unauthorized samples from David Batiste & The Gladiators' "Funky Soul". The fifth Circuit Federal Appellate Court found that the Batistes’ point to no evidence in the record demonstrating that consumers were confused or deceived by either the use of a digital sample of "Funky Soul" in "So On and So On", or the attribution to David Batiste as a co-author of the track. The Batistes' claim that Paul and Michael Batiste were improperly excluded from the liner notes accompanying the album also failed to suggest that consumers were confused, especially because the liner notes do credit the name of the band in which both Paul and Michael Batiste performed. Though Island Records won the lawsuit, the song was removed from subsequent releases of The Bliss Album and is no longer available for purchase in their publishing catalog.

Jesus Wept and DJ Minutemix's arrest
P.M. Dawn contributed a cover of "You Got Me Floatin'" to the 1993 compilation album Stone Free: A Tribute to Jimi Hendrix. Artists ranging from Pat Metheny to Eric Clapton to Ice-T's Body Count were included. They also remixed Beautiful People's "If 60's Was 90's".

Their 1995 album Jesus Wept was unable to attain the success of their first two albums. The album's highest charting single was "Downtown Venus", which contained a sample of Deep Purple's "Hush", and reached #48 on the Billboard chart.  Also, in 1995, P.M. Dawn was credited with the remix of White Zombie's "Blood, Milk and Sky" (Miss September Mix) on the Supersexy Swingin' Sounds compilation album. In the same year, Jarret Cordes (DJ Minutemix) was accused of sexually abusing a 14-year old relative and was subsequently arrested in Burlington County. The charges were dropped due to lack of evidence.

In 1996, P.M. Dawn contributed "Non-Fiction Burning" to the AIDS benefit album Red Hot + Rio produced by the Red Hot Organization. In 1998, Prince Be contributed the tracks "Perfect for You" and "Gotta Be...Movin' on Up" to the Marlon Wayans and David Spade comedy Senseless, followed later in the year by P.M. Dawn's fourth album, Dearest Christian, I'm So Very Sorry for Bringing You Here. Love, Dad. It was less successful again, with the album's single, "Being So Not for You (I Had No Right)" being a minor chart hit.

In 2000, they released the compilation, The Best of P.M. Dawn. Through their website, they also began selling a mail-order-only album called Fucked Music on December 1, 2000. This was paired with a bonus CD, Unreleased Vol. 1, and a T-shirt.

Prince Be's declining health and Doc G. stealing the trademark
Prince Be suffered a massive stroke in early 2005 that left him paralyzed on the left side of his body. Undeterred, P.M. Dawn appeared on NBC's Hit Me, Baby, One More Time show, performing "Set Adrift on Memory Bliss", and covered Puddle of Mudd's "Blurry". Despite Prince Be still suffering stroke, they beat Animotion, Missing Persons, Juice Newton and Shannon to claim the $20,000 charitable prize, which they contributed to the Juvenile Diabetes Research Foundation, as Prince Be was a diabetic.

Following their appearance on Hit Me, Baby, One More Time, Minutemix left the group due to internal differences. This led to the introduction of the Cordes brothers' paternal first cousin, Gregory Lewis Carr II, known by his stage name Doc. G (also known as 'Dr. Giggles'). Seeing his potential money opportunities performing as P.M. Dawn, Doc G. blatantly stole the trademark performing rights of P.M. Dawn. He sees an opportunity to take advantage of Prince Be's condition and is currently putting out music that is not consistent with the group's original ideals and production level.

On June 17, 2016, Prince Be died from renal disease, caused by complications of diabetes, at the age of 46 at a hospital in Neptune City, New Jersey. On April 6, 2018, Doc G. hired music producer K-R.O.K. as the new member of P.M. Dawn.

Legacy
On April 3, 2022, one of the Unsung documentary episode, highlighting the story of P.M. Dawn, premiered on TV One.

Discography

Studio albums

Compilation albums
2000: The Best of P.M. Dawn (V2)
2000: Unreleased Vol. 1 (Positive Plain Music)
2008: Most Requested (Sheridan Square Records)
2010: P.M. Dawn: Greatest Hits Live! (Sbcmg)

Singles

References

External links
P.M. Dawn memorial for Prince B
Unsung: P.M. Dawn documentary on YouTube

American hip hop groups
American contemporary R&B musical groups
Brit Award winners
East Coast hip hop groups
Gee Street Records artists
Musical groups established in 1988
Musical groups disestablished in 2016
Musicians from Jersey City, New Jersey
Sibling duos